The Zeeburgereiland is a triangular island on the east side of Amsterdam, in the Dutch province of North Holland. Formerly an industrial area, the island is being redeveloped as part of the IJburg new neighbourhood. It is crossed by the A10 motorway and, since 2005, the IJ Tram line of the Amsterdam Tram system.

References
Stadsdeel Amsterdam-Oost
Militair Zeeburg
Annie M.G. Schmidt Huis

External link

Neighbourhoods of Amsterdam
Artificial islands of Amsterdam
Amsterdam-Oost